Banca Românească is a Romanian bank based in Bucharest owned by Eximbank.

General data
The Bank owns over 100 locations (branches and business centers) and has 1,039 employees (December 2019). At the end of 2019, the Romanian Bank had assets of  6,630,686 RON.

References

External links
 Official site

Banks of Romania
Companies based in Bucharest
Banks established in 1993